Halfway House, also known as the Tyree Tavern, is a historic inn and tavern located at Ansted, Fayette County, West Virginia. It is a two-story, log and frame building with a gable roof measuring 50 feet long and 20 feet deep.  The original log section was built prior to 1810.  It was expanded to its present configuration about 1827.  It served as a stage coach stop on the James River and Kanawha Turnpike.  Notable guests included Daniel Webster, Henry Clay, and John Breckenridge.  It also was headquarters of the Chicago Gray Dragoons during the American Civil War. It was listed on the National Register of Historic Places in 1978.

References

External links
 Museum information

African-American history of West Virginia
American Civil War sites in West Virginia
Hotel buildings completed in 1810
Hotel buildings completed in 1827
Commercial buildings completed in 1810
Commercial buildings completed in 1827
Buildings and structures in Fayette County, West Virginia
Drinking establishments on the National Register of Historic Places in West Virginia
Fayette County, West Virginia in the American Civil War
History museums in West Virginia
Hotel buildings on the National Register of Historic Places in West Virginia
Museums in Fayette County, West Virginia
National Register of Historic Places in Fayette County, West Virginia
Log buildings and structures on the National Register of Historic Places in West Virginia
1810 establishments in Virginia